Waterside is the seventh studio album by Gary Hughes. This is the first solo album for Hughes in 14 years. The album was released on the 12th of March 2021, through Frontiers Records.

Track listing 
All songs written by Gary Hughes.

 "All at Once It Feels Like I Believe" – 4:34
 "Electra-Glide" – 5:11
 "Lay Down" – 7:52
 "The Runaway Damned" – 5:00
 "Screaming in the Halflight" – 4:14
 "Waterside" – 4:17
 "Video Show" – 5:21
 "Save My Soul" – 5:03
 "Seduce Me" – 4:36
 "When Love Is Done" – 3:37

Personnel 
Gary Hughes – lead and backing vocals, guitars, bass, keyboards and programming
Dann Rosingana – guitars
David Rosingana – bass
Darrel Treece-Birch – keyboards and drums
Karen Fell – backing vocals
Scott Hughes – lead and backing vocals

Production
Produced, engineered and mixed by Gary Hughes

References 

2021 albums
Albums produced by Gary Hughes
Frontiers Records albums
Gary Hughes albums